This is a list of crossings of the Red Deer River in the Canadian province of Alberta from the river's origin in Sawback Range in Alberta to its mouth at the South Saskatchewan River in Saskatchewan. Even though the river flows through the province of Saskatchewan, there are no current crossings over the river in the province.

Crossings in use

This is a list of crossings in use from upstream to downstream. Crossings include bridges, ferries, and dams (road, pedestrian, and railway).

Alberta

Saskatchewan

There are currently no crossings in Saskatchewan.

Crossings no longer in use

This is a list of notable crossings that are no longer in use that are not already listed above. Although there are quite a few crossings of the Red Deer River that are no longer in use, there are only a few worth mentioning.

Proposed crossings

References

Bridges in Alberta
Red Deer River